Emile Acquah (born 13 July 2000) is an English professional footballer who plays as a striker for Maidenhead United.

Career
In August 2018, after progressing through Southend United's academy, Acquah was loaned out to Isthmian Premier Division club Harlow Town. During his time at Harlow, Acquah scored eight goals in 28 league games. In March 2019, following scoring in his last game for Harlow in a 7–2 defeat against Wingate & Finchley, Acquah returned to Southend. Upon his return to Southend, Acquah made three EFL League One appearances in the remainder of the season. He scored his first senior goal for the Shrimpers in a 1–3 defeat at home to Ipswich Town on 26 October 2019. Acquah joined Maidenhead United on loan on 28 January 2020, but was recalled without playing a game for the Magpies to cover for injuries. Acquah re-joined Maidenhead on loan on 13 March 2020. He was released by Southend at the end of the 2020-21 season, before re-joining Maidenhead permanently.

Career statistics

References

External links

2000 births
Living people
Association football forwards
English footballers
Black British sportsmen
Footballers from Hackney, London
English Football League players
National League (English football) players
Isthmian League players
Southend United F.C. players
Harlow Town F.C. players
Maidenhead United F.C. players